Graeme Ernest Casley also known as Prince Graeme (born 1957) was the second, and last, prince of the self-declared Principality of Hutt River, a former micronation in Western Australia. He succeeded his father Leonard on 11 February 2017 after a 45-year self-proclaimed reign.

He abdicated the throne and was forced to dissolve the Principality of Hutt River on 3 August 2020, selling the land that belonged to the Principality to help settle the debts accumulated by his father. He told CNN that "It's very sad watching your father build up something for 50 years and then you have to close it down."

References

Micronational leaders
Monarchs who abdicated
Monarchy in Australia
Princes
Living people
1957 births